Advanced/Decay is the first full studio album by the electronic body music/futurepop band, Cesium_137.

Track listing
 "The Fall" – 5:45
 "End Game" – 4:59
 "Regrets" – 5:30
 "Darkest Dream" – 6:30
 "Last Days" – 5:04
 "Placebo" – 0:43
 "Effigy" – 4:32
 "Failure" – 3:38
 "Effigy (Caltrops mix)" – 6:52
 "Effigy (Crematory mix)" – 5:21

References

External links 
 Advanced/Decay at Discogs
 Advanced/Decay at MusicBrainz alt.link

Cesium 137 (band) albums
2001 debut albums